The Oba of Lagos, also known as the Eleko of Eko, is the traditional ruler (Oba) of Lagos.

The Oba is a ceremonial Yoruba sovereign with no political power, but is sought as a counsel or sponsor by politicians who seek support from the residents of Lagos, the financial heart of Nigeria and the largest city in Africa. The Oba has appeared in tourism advertisements on behalf of the city, often stating "You've gotta go to Lagos", among various other ceremonial roles.

The current Oba of Lagos is Rilwan Akiolu, who has held the title since 2003.

History
All Obas of Lagos trace their lineage to Ashipa, a war captain of the Oba of Benin. Ashipa was rewarded with the title of the Oloriogun (or War leader) and received the Oba of Benin's sanction to govern Lagos on his behalf. Some Benin accounts of history have the Ashipa as son or grandson of the Oba of Benin.  Other accounts note that Ashipa is a Yoruba corruption of the Benin name Aisika-hienbore (translated "we shall not desert this place").

Ashipa received a sword and royal drum as symbols of his authority from the Oba of Benin on his mission to Lagos. Additionally, the Oba of Benin deployed a group of Benin officers charged with preserving Benin's interests in Lagos. These officers, led by Eletu Odibo, were the initial members of the Akarigbere class of Lagos White Cap Chiefs.

Prior to the arrival of the British, the Oba of Benin had "the undisputed right to crown or confirm the individual whom the people of Lagos elect[ed] to be their King".

The defeat of Oba Kosoko by British forces on December 28, 1851, in what is now known as the Bombardment of Lagos or Reduction of Lagos, or locally as Ogun Ahoyaya or Ogun Agidingbi (after boiling cannons), put an end to Lagos' s former allegiance to the Oba of Benin.

Kosoko was therefore the last Oba of Lagos to remit annual tributes from the people of Lagos to the Oba of Benin. Oba Akitoye, who was re-installed to the throne by the British, "seized the opportunity of his restoration under British protection to repudiate his former allegiance" to Benin and rebuffed subsequent tribute requests from the Oba of Benin.

Previous rulers of Lagos have used the titles of Ologun (derived from Oloriogun), Eleko and, most recently, Oba of Lagos.

The Royal Seat
The official residence of the king, since 1630, is Iga Idunganran, a castle renovated by the Portuguese over the course of close to a century. It is today a very popular tourist site.

List of Obas of Lagos
 Ashipa, founder of Lagos dynasty but not crowned as Oba of Lagos (c. 1682-1716)
Ado (1716–1755) first Oba of Lagos (son of Ashipa/Esikpa)
 Gabaro (1755–1760)
 Akinsemoyin  (c. 1760-1775) 
 Eletu Kekere (c. 1775 - 1780)
 Ologun Kutere (also Ologunkutere / Ologunkuture) (1780-c. 1801) 
 Interregnum between Ologun Kutere and Adele (c 1805 -  c. 1810/11) 
 Adele Ajosun (1811-1821) 
 Oṣinlokun Ajan (Oshinlokun, Eshinlokun) (1821–1829)
 Idewu Ojulari (1829–1832) or until 1835 
 Adele Ajosun (second term) (1835-1837) 
 Oluwole (1837-1841)
 Akitoye  (1841-1845)
 Kosoko (1845–1851)
 Akitoye (second term) (1851-1853)
 Dosunmu (1853–1885)
 Oyekan I (1885–1900)
 Eshugbayi Eleko (1901-1925)
 Ibikunle Akitoye (1925–1928)
 Sanusi Olusi (1928–1931)
 Eshugbayi Eleko (second term) (1931-1932)
 Falolu Dosunmu (1932–1949)
 Adeniji Adele (1949–1964)
 Adeyinka Oyekan II (1965–2003)
 Rilwan Akiolu (2003–)

See also
 Erelu Kuti
 Timeline of Lagos city

References

10. Yusuf Olatunji.  Volume 17:02

Further reading
 
 
 
 
 

 
History of Lagos
Yoruba royal titles
Lagos-related lists